If I Could Marry the Minister (Swedish: Tänk, om jag gifter mig med prästen) is a 1941 Swedish romantic drama film directed by Ivar Johansson and starring Viveca Lindfors, Georg Rydeberg, Arnold Sjöstrand. with screenplay by Ester Lindin and Ivar Johansson. The film's sets were designed by the art director Bertil Duroj.

Plot 
Eva Örn, a young teacher, moves to rural Vikarlunda, where her good looks and strong opinions estrange her from the locals. She begins a clandestine affair with the priest, Ingvar Hagson.

Cast 
 Viveca Lindfors as Eva Örn
 Georg Rydeberg as 	Ingvar Hagson
 Arnold Sjöstrand as Knut Knutsson of Sjövalla
 Nils Lundell as 	Albert Sundström
 Anna Lindahl as 	Greta Knutsson
 Gudrun Brost as 	Helga Persson of Mon
 Sven Bergvall as 	Persson of Mon
 Linnéa Hillberg as Sophie Ekeberger
 Viran Rydkvist as 	Ester Örn 
 Arthur Natorp as 	Pettersson, Organist
 Axel Högel as 	Mr. Örn
 Ruth Stevens as 	Doris Örn
 Torsten Bergström as 	Brother Johannes
 Gabriel Alw as Sjövalla's Helping Hand

Controversy and reception 
The novel by Ester Lindin which forms the basis of the film was already very controversial, and when it was announced that it would be adapted for the screen, a delegation of priests petitioned the film company Luxfilm and demanded that filming be stopped. The chief executive officer issued an unofficial warning.  Despite this, the film was made and became one of the greatest successes of the 1940s.

One reviewer at the time wrote: "Since her novel was released [Ester Lindin] has had the questionable pleasure of getting pilloried in cheap cabarets and causeries as the amorality priestess number one. The film gives all these moral busybodies an answer that should sting – never before has moral hypocrisy and the false idyll of the philistine been exposed to such a mighty attack."

References

Bibliography 
 Nelmes, Jill & Selbo, Jule. Women Screenwriters: An International Guide. Palgrave Macmillan, 2015.
 Qvist, Per Olov & von Bagh, Peter. Guide to the Cinema of Sweden and Finland. Greenwood Publishing Group, 2000.

External links 
 
 http://www.svenskfilmdatabas.se/sv/item/?type=film&itemid=3965
 https://www.filminstitutet.se/sv/fa-kunskap-om-film/ta-del-av-filmsamlingarna/filmer/tank-om-jag-gifter-mig-med-prasten/
 https://www.nt.se/kultur-noje/med-och-om-ester-lindin-om4360046.aspx

1941 films
Swedish drama films
1941 drama films
1940s Swedish-language films
Films directed by Ivar Johansson
Swedish black-and-white films
1940s Swedish films